François Xavier Nguyên Quang-Sách (May 25, 1925 – July 7, 2013) was a Vietnamese Catholic bishop.

Ordained to the priesthood in 1956, he was named bishop in 1976 and became bishop of the Da Nang Diocese in 1988. He retired in 2002.

Notes

1925 births
2013 deaths
21st-century Roman Catholic bishops in Vietnam
20th-century Roman Catholic bishops in Vietnam